Darreh (also known as Maḩalleh-ye Bālā Darreh) is a village in Miankuh Rural District, in the Central District of Mehriz County, Yazd Province, Iran. At the 2006 census, its population was 90, in 49 families.

References 

Populated places in Mehriz County